Potęgowo , , is a village in Słupsk County, Pomeranian Voivodeship, in northern Poland. It is the seat of the gmina (administrative district) called Gmina Potęgowo.

The village has a population of 1,416.

References

Villages in Słupsk County